Black Venus is a 2010 French drama film directed by Abdellatif Kechiche. It is based on the life of Sarah Baartman, a Khoikhoi woman who in the early 19th century was exhibited in Europe under the name "Hottentot Venus". The film was nominated for the Golden Lion at the 67th Venice International Film Festival, where it was awarded the Equal Opportunity Award.

Plot
Paris 1815, the Royal Academy of Medicine. "I have never seen a human head so similar to that of an ape". Standing by a moulded cast of Saartjie Baartman's body, anatomist Georges Cuvier's verdict is categorical. Seven years earlier, Saartjie left her native South Africa with her master, Caezar, to expose her caged body to the audiences of London's freak shows. Free and enslaved all at the same time, the "Hottentot Venus" became an icon in the slums, destined to be sacrificed in the pursuit of a shimmering vision of prosperity.

Cast
 Yahima Torres as Sarah Baartman
 Andre Jacobs as Caezar
 Olivier Gourmet as Réaux, le forain
 Elina Löwensohn as Jeanne
 François Marthouret as Georges Cuvier
 Jean-Christophe Bouvet as Mercailler
 Jonathan Pienaar as Alexander Dunlop

Reception
Black Venus holds a 100% rating on Rotten Tomatoes, based on five reviews.

References

External links

Belgian drama films
2010 films
2010 drama films
French drama films
2010s French-language films
Films directed by Abdel Kechiche
Films set in the 1810s
Films set in London
Films set in Paris
Drama films based on actual events
French-language Belgian films
2010s French films